The 1993 NFL draft was the procedure by which National Football League teams selected amateur college football players. It is officially known as the NFL Annual Player Selection Meeting. The draft was held April 25–26, 1993, at the Marriot Marquis in New York City, New York. No teams chose to claim any players in the supplemental draft that year, but the New York Giants and Kansas City Chiefs forfeited their first and second round picks, respectively, due to selecting quarterback Dave Brown and defensive end Darren Mickell in the 1992 supplemental draft.

With the first overall pick of the draft, the New England Patriots selected quarterback Drew Bledsoe.

Player selections

|}

Trades
In the explanations below, (D) denotes trades that took place during the 1993 Draft, while (PD) indicates trades completed pre-draft.

Round one

Round two

Round three

Round four

Round five

Round six

Round seven

Round eight

Notable undrafted players

|}

Hall of Famers
 Willie Roaf, offensive tackle from Louisiana Tech, taken 1st round 8th overall by New Orleans Saints.
Inducted: Professional Football Hall of Fame class of 2012.

 Michael Strahan, defensive end from Texas Southern, taken 2nd round 40th overall by New York Giants.
Inducted: Professional Football Hall of Fame class of 2014.

 Jerome Bettis, running back from Notre Dame, taken 1st round 10th overall by Los Angeles Rams.
Inducted: Professional Football Hall of Fame class of 2015.

 Will Shields, offensive guard from Nebraska, taken 3rd round 74th overall by Kansas City Chiefs.
Inducted: Professional Football Hall of Fame class of 2015.

John Lynch, strong safety from Stanford, taken 3rd round 82nd overall by Tampa Bay Buccaneers.
Inducted: Professional Football Hall of Fame Class of 2021.

Notes

References

External links
 NFL.com – 1993 Draft
 databaseFootball.com – 1993 Draft
 Pro Football Hall of Fame

National Football League Draft
NFL Draft
Draft
NFL Draft
NFL Draft
American football in New York City
1990s in Manhattan
Sporting events in New York City
Sports in Manhattan